Dance Deewane Junior 1 was a spin off season of the Indian dance reality television series Dance Deewane that premiered from 23 April 2022 to 17 July 2022 on Colors TV.

Production 
Dance Deewane Juniors scheduled to start on 23 April 2022, On 10 April 2022 a promo was released on Colors TV official Instagram. The show is hosted and presented by  Karan Kundra and Judged by Neetu Singh, Nora Fatehi and Marzi Pestonji.

Gangs 
The following are the three choreographers of the season:

 Tushar Shetty
 Sonali Kar
 Pratik Utekar

Contestants 
Top 15 contestants were chosen.

 Solo
 Duo
 Group

Elimination Chart

 Week 2 to 6 judges decided which one contestant made it to the Top 7.
 In Week 4 & 6, judges decided contestants to be eliminated.
 From Week 7, public votes were opened and based on public votes eliminations took place.
  The contestant was the Winner.
  The contestant was the Runner-up.
  The contestants were Finalists & eliminated during the final.
  The contestants won entry to TOP 6 and were immune.
  The contestant received all 3 Plays (Week 1) or won Dance Battle (Week 2-6).
  The contestant won Hard 4 Challenge of the week  (Week 2-4) or was Top 2/3 Gangs of the week  (Week 5-6) .
  The contestant was safe.
  The contestant was lost Dance Battle.
  The contestant didn't perform that week in Dance Battle.
  The contestant was Eliminated.
  The contestant was injured and had to leave the competition.

Hard 4 Challenges 

 The contestant won the challenge from their Gang.

Gangs Score Board

Hardcore Dance Battle

Hardcore top 5 with dancing star

Guests

References

External links
 Dance Deewane Juniors at Colors TV
 Dance Deewane Juniors on Voot

Indian dance television shows